Exeter is a city in Tulare County, California, United States. It is situated in the San Joaquin Valley near the foothills of the Sierra Nevada. The population was 10,334 at the 2010 census.

History
Before the arrival of European settlers, Yokuts settled around an area in an oak forest two miles north of Exeter.  The current town site was a plain that possessed elk, antelope, frogs, and deer. Rocky Hill, to the east of the city, offered shelter to native tribes when the plain flooded. Several caves on the hill contain petroglyphs, though some of the most important of these were destroyed by local vandals/looters and poorly managed and unsupervised steer.

The town site traces its roots to the construction of a railroad line through the San Joaquin Valley, by 1888 a line passed through the area.  A representative of the Southern Pacific Railroad, D.W. Parkhurst, purchased the land from an early settler, John Firebaugh, and formed the town which he named after his own hometown of Exeter, England.

The damming of the Kaweah valley during the 1930s provided a reliable source of water for agriculture. Cattle ranching grew at the beginning of the 20th century, led by the Gill Cattle Company, which opened in the late 1800s and was once the largest such business in the United States. The town incorporated in 1911. In October, 1929, Exeter was the site of a large Anti-Filipino race riot. A mob stormed a Filipino work camp, bludgeoning 50 Filipino laborers and burning their camp to the ground. This race-riot sparked a wave of Anti-Filipino hatred. In 2006 the Exeter city of commerce officially apologized for such actions and offered restitution to survivors.

Professional artists depicting the history of the area have painted huge murals on exterior walls throughout the downtown area. There are currently 31 murals in this outdoor art gallery.

Geography

Climate

Demographics

2010
At the 2010 census Exeter had a population of 10,334. The racial makeup of Exeter was 7,150 (69.2%) White, 67 (0.6%) African American, 171 (1.7%) Native American, 138 (1.3%) Asian, 8 (0.1%) Pacific Islander, 2,416 (23.4%) from other races, and 384 (3.7%) from two or more races. Hispanic or Latino of any race were 4,703 persons (45.5%).

The census reported that 10,261 people (99.3% of the population) lived in households, 57 (0.6%) lived in non-institutionalized group quarters, and 16 (0.2%) were institutionalized.

There were 3,378 households, 1,552 (45.9%) had children under the age of 18 living in them, 1,801 (53.3%) were opposite-sex married couples living together, 575 (17.0%) had a female householder with no husband present, 227 (6.7%) had a male householder with no wife present.  There were 233 (6.9%) unmarried opposite-sex partnerships, and 12 (0.4%) same-sex married couples or partnerships. 652 households (19.3%) were one person and 313 (9.3%) had someone living alone who was 65 or older. The average household size was 3.04.  There were 2,603 families (77.1% of households); the average family size was 3.45.

The age distribution was 3,285 people (31.8%) under the age of 18, 1,020 people (9.9%) aged 18 to 24, 2,586 people (25.0%) aged 25 to 44, 2,255 people (21.8%) aged 45 to 64, and 1,188 people (11.5%) who were 65 or older.  The median age was 31.2 years. For every 100 females, there were 94.5 males.  For every 100 females age 18 and over, there were 90.4 males.

There were 3,600 housing units at an average density of 1,461.6 per square mile, of the occupied units 2,036 (60.3%) were owner-occupied and 1,342 (39.7%) were rented. The homeowner vacancy rate was 3.4%; the rental vacancy rate was 6.3%.  6,111 people (59.1% of the population) lived in owner-occupied housing units and 4,150 people (40.2%) lived in rental housing units.

2000
At the 2000 census there were 9,168 people in 3,001 households, including 2,325 families, in the city. The racial makeup of the city was 69.73% White, 0.69% African American, 1.47% Native American, 1.30% Asian, 0.04% Pacific Islander, 23.20% from other races, and 3.57% from two or more races. Hispanic or Latino of any race were 38.25%.

Of the 3,001 households 45.1% had children under the age of 18 living with them, 55.6% were married couples living together, 15.6% had a female householder with no husband present, and 22.5% were non-families. 18.8% of households were one person and 9.9% were one person aged 65 or older.  The average household size was 3.02 and the average family size was 3.43.

The age distribution was 33.7% under the age of 18, 10.1% from 18 to 24, 26.8% from 25 to 44, 18.2% from 45 to 64, and 11.1% 65 or older.  The median age was 30 years. For every 100 females, there were 92.9 males.  For every 100 females age 18 and over, there were 89.9 males.

The median income for a household in the city was $33,738, and the median family income  was $37,033. Males had a median income of $32,308 versus $27,371 for females. The per capita income for the city was $13,795.  About 14.2% of families and 19.4% of the population were below the poverty line, including 24.8% of those under age 18 and 12.0% of those age 65 or over.

Kenny Guinn, former governor of Nevada, was raised here as a child. Robert List, former governor of Nevada, was raised in Exeter, too.

Economy
Major employers in Exeter include Waterman Industries, Svenhard's Swedish Bakery and Peninsula Packaging.

Government

Local government 
The current mayor is Teresa Boyce

State and federal 

In the United States House of Representatives, Exeter is in

Education
The public school system in Exeter consists of: Exeter Union High School (9-12), the Wilson Middle School (6-8), Rocky Hill Elementary (K-5), Lincoln Elementary (K-5) and Kaweah High School (a continuation high school). The 1999-2000 enrollment was: grades K-8, 1,936 and grades 9-12, 1101 students.

Notable people 
 Joseph James DeAngelo, convicted as the Golden State Killer and the Visalia Ransacker in 2020, was a police officer in Exeter from 1973 to 1976, same time as when the Ransacker crimes occurred in neighbouring Visalia
 Jim Qualls, former Major League Baseball outfielder for the Chicago Cubs
 Ron Robinson, former Major League Baseball pitcher for the Cincinnati Reds and the Milwaukee Brewers 
 Brad Mills, former player and coach of Major League Baseball
 Jeriome Robertson, former baseball pitcher with Houston Astros and Cleveland Indians, grew up and died in Exeter.
Satoshi Hirayama, former baseball star for Hiroshima Toyo Carp, born and raised in Exeter.

Gallery

References

External links

Exeter Chamber of Commerce

Cities in Tulare County, California
San Joaquin Valley
Incorporated cities and towns in California
1911 establishments in California